Peter Dunne (born 1954) is a New Zealand politician.

Peter Dunne may also refer to:

Peter Masten Dunne, historian
Fr. Peter Dunne of Fighting Father Dunne

See also
Pete Dunne (disambiguation)
Peter Dunn (disambiguation)